Keoma is a hamlet in southern Alberta under the jurisdiction of Rocky View County.

Keoma is located approximately 35 km (21 mi) northeast of Downtown Calgary, on Highway 566, 2.0 km (1.2 mi) east of Highway 9 and 19 km (12 mi) north of the Trans-Canada Highway.

Keoma is an Indigenous name for "over there", far away. The hamlet was settled in 1910 when the Canadian Pacific Railway (CPR) opened up land for irrigation. It is assumed that the CPR named the site, but this is not definitive. The post office was in operation from January 15, 1910 to June 27, 1986.

Demographics 

The population of Keoma according to the 2018 municipal census conducted by Rocky View County is 89, an increase from its 2013 municipal census population count of 67.

See also 
List of communities in Alberta
List of hamlets in Alberta

References 

Karamitsanis, Aphrodite (1992). Place Names of Alberta – Volume II, Southern Alberta, University of Calgary Press, Calgary, Alberta.

Read, Tracey (1983). Acres and Empires – A History of the Municipal District of Rocky View, Calgary, Alberta.

Calgary Region
Designated places in Alberta
Hamlets in Alberta
Rocky View County